Baszków refers to the following places in Poland:

 Baszków, Greater Poland Voivodeship
 Baszków, Łódź Voivodeship